The 1989 season was Molde's 15th season in the top flight of Norwegian football. This season Molde competed in 1. divisjon (first tier) and the Norwegian Cup.

In the league, Molde finished in 4th position, 15 points behind winners Lillestrøm. 

Molde participated in the 1989 Norwegian Cup. They reached their second final in club history. Molde drew Viking 2–2 after extra time in the final played on 22 October at Ullevaal Stadion. Øystein Neerland and Petter Belsvik scored Molde's goals. The replay was played the following Sunday, on 29 October. Molde lost the replay 1–2 against Viking, Geir Sperre scored Molde's only goal of the game.

Squad
Source:

Competitions

1. divisjon

Results summary

Positions by round

Results

League table

Norwegian Cup

Final

Squad statistics

Appearances and goals
Lacking information:
Appearance statistics from Norwegian Cup rounds 1, 4, quarter-finals and semi-finals (7–9 players in first round, 11–13 players in fourth round, 8–10 players in the quarter-finals and 9–11 players in the semi-finals) are missing.

 

 
 

 

 
|}

Goalscorers

See also
Molde FK seasons

References

External links
nifs.no

1989
Molde